Lars Kornelius Edvard Berg (16 May 1901 – 11 January 1969) was a Norwegian teacher, novelist, short story writer and playwright.

He was born at Kvaløya as the son of fisherman and farmer Emil Larsen Berg and Olufine Johansen, and grew up at a small farm. From 1947 he was married to Aud Norvåg. He died at Kvaløya in January 1969.

He graduated from the teacher's college in Tromsø in 1922, and worked as a teacher in Bø i Vesterålen from 1922 to 1923, Ørsta from 1923 to 1924 and Hillesøy from 1924 to 1934. He later worked as a headmaster in Tromsøysund from 1940 to 1967. He made his literary debut in 1934 with the novel Men det var det ingen som visste, and followed up with  Du er den første kvinne in 1935. Berg was influenced by ideas from Freud's psychoanalysis. His candid treatment of sexuality-related problems in the first two novels led to strong reactions and initiated a spirited  cultural debate in the late 1930s. His next two novels were Du skal svare (1936) and Fire søsken går ut (1937). In the late 1930s he also published a number of short stories in the periodical Arbeidermagasinet.

During the occupation of Norway by Nazi Germany Berg was a member of the resistance movement in Troms. He was arrested in 1942 and incarcerated at the Grini concentration camp. Among his post war novels are Kvinna og havet from 1950, Vi må ro i natt from 1951, and Den lange vegen from 1967. He was an advocate for theatre in Northern Norway for many years, and is given credit for the establishing of Hålogaland Teater (after his death). His first play was Maria, about a rehabilitation center for young girls off the straight path. The play was staged at Det Norske Teatret in April 1959, directed by Dagmar Myhrvold, with Elisabeth Bang as "Maria", the headmistress, and Liv Thorsen as the young girl "Tora". The play was also adapted into an audio play for Radioteatret. His play Petter Dass was later performed at Hålogaland Teater. Berg was awarded Mads Wiel Nygaards Endowment in 1968 (shared with Kjell Heggelund).

References

External links 
Family genealogy

People from Tromsø
Norwegian resistance members
Grini concentration camp survivors
1901 births
1969 deaths
20th-century Norwegian novelists
20th-century Norwegian dramatists and playwrights
Norwegian male dramatists and playwrights
Norwegian male novelists